Midnight Stroll is a blues album by Robert Cray and featuring the Memphis Horns. It was released in June 1990 through Mercury Records.

Also released in the UK on Mercury was an advance four-track EP called The Midnight Stroll EP. Tracks on this are: "The Forecast (Calls for Pain)", "Holdin' Court", "Labor of Love" and "Midnight Stroll". MERCD 330. (Maybe also released elsewhere as INT 878 209-2.)

Track listing
"The Forecast (Calls for Pain)" (David Plenn, Dennis Walker) – 4:00
"These Things" (Cray) – 4:55
"My Problem" (Cray) – 4:41
"Labor of Love" (Tim Kaihatsu) – 3:56
"Bouncin' Back" (Dennis Walker) – 4:05
"Consequences" (Bonnie Hayes, Kevin Hayes, David Nagler-Burns) – 4:24
"The Things You Do to Me" (Cray) – 4:44
"Walk Around Time" (Kevin Hayes, Jimmy Pugh, Oscar Washington) – 4:18
"Move a Mountain" (Cray, Tim Kaihatsu) – 4:07
"Holdin' Court" (Richard Cousins, Hayes) – 4:40
"Midnight Stroll" (Cray, Dennis Walker) – 5:49

Personnel
Per the liner notes
Robert Cray - vocals, guitar
Richard Cousins - bass
Jimmy Pugh - keyboards
Kevin Hayes - drums, percussion
Tim Kaihatsu - guitar
The Memphis Horns
Wayne Jackson - trumpet, trombone
Andrew Love - tenor saxophone

Certifications and sales

References

Robert Cray albums
1990 albums
1990 debut EPs
Mercury Records albums